The Speaks is a popular five-member band composed of mostly Filipinos and Filipino-Americans, although later members of the band were not all Filipino. The band members include guitarist Cal Stamp, bassist Jerry Delino, drummer John Abelende, vocalist Rafael Toledo, and guitarist Archie dela Cruz.  Original members included percussionist Johnny Abelende and guitarist Siegfred Fuster. The band was established in Washington, D.C. during the late 1990s in the United States.  The band is notably remembered for their hit songs "High" and "Life's A Joke". The song "High" was ranked in the Top 40 in the Philippines (it was the no. 1 single for seven weeks), while "Life's A Joke" stayed on the Top 30 for almost 6 months in the Philippines in 2005. Their album, according to the Manila Bulletin, debuted and remained as number one on the Filetopia online radio station in the United Kingdom. The album, entitled This is the Time was a hit in Asia radio charts (including Magic 89.9's Final Countdown, and in the Top 20 of 97.1 WLS-FM), and the album's title track reached the Top 15 in the United States. Their music videos have been featured on MTV Asia and Myx. The Washington Post declared the band as one of the Top 5 bands in 2009.

The Washington, D.C.-based band won competitions such as the JAXX "World's Largest Battle of the Bands" (2003), the DC Hard Rock Café/SoBe "Ultimate Altitude Buzz" Battle of the Bands Finals (2003), and the DC 101 "Last Band Standing" competition (2004).

The band was co-managed by Rob Shipp and Jerry Garcia.

Discography

Albums
 Life's A Joke (2003)
(Import version released in 2005)
 This is the Time (2007)
(Import version released in 2008)
 The Price of Freedom (2011)

Singles
 High
 Life's A Joke
 This is the Time
 Carpe Diem
 Regret
 Nowhere Fast

References

Filipino rock music groups
Rock music groups from Washington, D.C.
Filipino-American musical groups
Musical groups established in 1999
1999 establishments in the United States